The Bahamas competed in the 2014 Commonwealth Games in Glasgow, Scotland from 23 July – 3 August 2014.

Athletics

Men
Track and road events

Field events

Women
Track and road events

Field events

Boxing

Men

Cycling

Road

Men

Judo

Men

Women

Swimming

Men

Women

Wrestling

Men's freestyle

References

Nations at the 2014 Commonwealth Games
2014
Commonwealth Games